Sciaroidea is a superfamily in the infraorder Bibionomorpha. There are about 16 families and more than 15,000 described species in Sciaroidea. Most of its constituent families are various gnats.

Description 
As nematoceran flies, sciaroid adults generally have long segmented antennae, while their larvae have a well-developed head and mouthparts.

Aside from this, sciaroids vary in appearance. For example, Sciaridae adults have each eye extended dorsally to form an "eye bridge", a feature not found in related families. Cecidomyiidae adults have a distinctive reduced wing venation, while their larvae are atypical for nematoceran larvae in having a very small head capsule.

Ecology 
Most fungus gnats (Sciaroidea excluding Cecidomyiidae) live in forests with their larvae occurring in fungi, dead wood and soil. There are some which live in wetlands such as fens. Several genera of Sciaridae and Mycetophilidae may reach high abundances in damp buildings with wet organic matter.

Some species of Sciaridae and Cecidomyiidae are among the rare Diptera that spend their entire lives in soil. These are wingless as adults.

Sciaroid larvae typically feed on fungi but there are some which form plant galls (many Cecidomyiidae) or prey on other invertebrates (Keroplatidae).

Phylogeny 
A 2016 molecular phylogenetic analysis confirmed that Sciaroidea is a monophyletic group and should include both Cecidomyiidae and Ditomyiidae.

Families
These 16 families belong to the superfamily Sciaroidea:
 Bolitophilidae 
 Cecidomyiidae  – gall midges and wood midges, sometimes excluded from Sciaroidea
 Diadocidiidae 
 Ditomyiidae 
 Keroplatidae  – predatory fungus gnats
 Lygistorrhinidae  – long-beaked fungus gnats
 Mycetophilidae  
 Rangomaramidae  – long-winged fungus gnats
 Sciaridae  – dark-winged fungus gnats
 † Antefungivoridae 
 † Archizelmiridae 
 † Eoditomyiidae
 † Mesosciophilidae
 † Paraxymyiidae 
 † Pleciofungivoridae 
 † Protopleciidae

References

External links
 
 

Sciaroidea
Diptera superfamilies